Dead Heart is a 1996 Australian film. It was written and directed by Nick Parsons, and starred Bryan Brown, Angie Milliken, Ernie Dingo, Aaron Pedersen and John Jarratt. As a play, the piece was staged by Belvoir St Theatre, directed by Neil Armfield, at the Eveleigh rail yards, Sydney, in 1994. In 1993 the play received the NSW Premier's Literary Award for a play.

Story arc
The story is set in the isolated Outback, mainly Aboriginal town of Wala Wala, where an Aboriginal man is found dead in the local police lock up. The film explores the strained and complex relations between the people of the town in the aftermath, amidst growing tensions of forbidden love, sacrilege and murder. Bryan Brown plays the hardboiled local policeman and Ernie Dingo plays the idealistic local Aboriginal Christian pastor. Each of the characters is confronted with how to reconcile Aboriginal tradition with contemporary Australia.

Production
Nick Parsons wrote a script called Dead Heart based on the true story of an aboriginal who killed someone in the 1930s for traditional reasons. Parsons was not happy with it but decided to rewrite the story as a play when he attended National Institute of Dramatic Art NIDA. He went up to the outback for five weeks to do research, and the resulting play was very popular. Bryan Brown read the original draft and wanted to produce it.

Awards
The film gained three Australian Film Institute Awards nominations: "Best Achievement in Sound", "Best Original Music Score" and "Best Screenplay, Adapted".

The film won the Film Critics Circle of Australia Award for "Best Screenplay".

Box office
The movie grossed roughly $A500,000 but was not as successful in the US or UK.

See also
 Cinema of Australia

References

External links
 
 
Dead Heart at Oz Movies

1996 films
Australian drama films
Films about Aboriginal Australians
Films set in the Northern Territory
1996 drama films
1990s English-language films
1990s Australian films